Exim Bank (Comoros) (EBC), also Exim Bank Comores SA (French), is  a commercial bank in Moroni, the Comoros. 

The bank is one of the commercial banks licensed by the Central Bank of the Comoros, which is the country's central bank and national banking regulator.

Location
The headquarters of the bank are locate in Moroni, on the Grande Comore Island.

Overview
The bank is an expanding financial services provider with five interconnected branches, as of March 2015.

Exim Bank Group

Exim Bank (Comoros) is a subsidiary of Exim Bank (Tanzania). It is member of the Exim Bank Group (East Africa), a financial services conglomerate, with subsidiaries in Tanzania, Comoros, Djibouti and Uganda, and with assets in excess of US$3.3 billion, as of June 2016.

Branches
As of October 2017, the bank maintains branches at the following locations:
(1) Main Branch, at Moroni, Grande Comore Island. (2) Second Branch (3) Moheli Branch, at Fomboni, Moheli Island (4) Domoni Branch, at Domoni, Anjouan Island. (5) Mitsamiouli Branch, at Mitsamiouli, Grand Comore Island.

See also
Exim Bank (Tanzania)
Exim Bank (Uganda)
Exim Bank (Djibouti)
List of banks in the Comoros

References

External links
Website of Exim Bank Tanzania
 Website of Exim Bank Comoros

Banks of the Comoros
Economy of the Comoros
Banks established in 2007